Nelson Asofa-Solomona (born 29 February 1996) is a New Zealand professional rugby league footballer who plays as a  for the Melbourne Storm in the NRL and New Zealand at international level. 

Asofa-Solomona won the 2017 NRL Grand Final and the 2020 NRL Grand Final with Melbourne.

Early life
Asofa-Solomona was born in Wellington, New Zealand, Nelson's parents are of Maori, Samoan, Tokelau and Irish descent. He is the first cousin of Wests Tigers  Ken Maumalo.

Asofa-Solomona grew up playing rugby union for Upper Hutt Rams before playing rugby league. He played his junior rugby league for the Upper Hutt Tigers and Wellington Orcas junior representative team while playing rugby union at Wellington College. He was then signed by the Melbourne Storm at 15 years of age.

Personal life
Asofa-Solomona briefly trialled veganism, however found it did not work with his dietary requirements. Asofa-Solomona has, on multiple occasions, spoken of the influences his family has had on him throughout the years. In 2018, he stated that being able to provide for his family was one of the main perks of playing rugby league for the Melbourne Storm. Asofa-Solomona has several tattoos, notably two Samoan designs - one on his right leg and one covering his right forearm. He has stated that the flowers in his leg design are a tribute to his sisters and the women in his life.
Asofa-Solomona has four dogs: two dachshunds, a husky & a Staffordshire bull terrier.

Playing career

2014
In 2014, Asofa-Solomona played for the Melbourne Storm's NYC team. On 2 September, he was named at second-row in the 2014 NYC Team of the Year. On 18 October, he played for the Junior Kiwis against the Junior Kangaroos at second-row in the Kiwis' 15-14 win at Mount Smart Stadium.

2015
In 2015, Asofa-Solomona graduated to Melbourne's Queensland Cup team, Sunshine Coast Falcons. In Round 8 of the 2015 NRL season, he made his NRL debut for the Melbourne Storm against the Manly-Warringah Sea Eagles, playing off the interchange bench in the Storms' 12-10 loss at AAMI Park. On 2 May, he again played for the Junior Kiwis against the Junior Kangaroos, playing at prop in the Kiwis' 22-20 loss at Cbus Super Stadium. In Round 20 against the St George Illawarra Dragons, he scored his first NRL career try i in Melbourne's 22-4 win at McLean Park. He finished off his debut year in the NRL having played in 12 matches and scoring one try.

2016
On 1 February, Asofa-Solomona was named in Melbourne's 2016 NRL Auckland Nines squad. Asofa-Solomona finished the 2016 NRL season with him playing in 15 matches for the Melbourne club.

2017
In February 2017, Asofa-Solomona was named in the Melbourne squad for the 2017 NRL Auckland Nines. In April 2017, Asofa-Solomona was called into the New Zealand Kiwis squad with a view to making his international debut against the Kangaroos but had to withdraw due to a hand injury. On 6 July 2017, Asofa-Solomona extended his contract with the Melbourne Storm to the end of the 2019 NRL season. On 1 October 2017, in Melbourne's 2017 NRL Grand Final against the North Queensland Cowboys, Asofa-Solomona played off the interchange bench in the 34-6 victory. Asofa-Solomona finished his successful 2017 NRL season with him playing in 26 matches and scoring four tries for Melbourne. On 5 October 2017, Asofa-Solomona was named in the New Zealand Kiwis 24-man squad for the 2017 Rugby League World Cup. On 28 October 2017, Asofa-Solomona made his international test debut for New Zealand against Samoa, where he played off the interchange bench and scored 1 try in the 38-8 win at Mt Smart Stadium.

2018
Asofa-Solomona was part of the victorious 2018 World Club Challenge and was awarded Man of the Match award. He was also part of the Melbourne Storm team that played in the 2018 NRL Grand Final. Asofa-Solomona was nominated for Dally M Prop of the year in 2018. Asofa-Solomona was part of the New Zealand national rugby league team tour of Denver, Colorado, in June 2018. It was the first time that Asofa-Solomona had played in a team with cousin, Ken Maumalo, professionally.

2019
Asofa-Solomona was awarded two Dally M points for his round one appearance in the victory over the Brisbane Broncos. He won a popular vote for tackle of the round for his hit on Matt Gillett. Round two saw Asofa-Solomona score his first try of the season.
Asofa-Solomona played 27 games for Melbourne in the 2019 NRL season as the club finished as runaway minor premiers.  Asofa-Solomona played in the club's preliminary final defeat against the Sydney Roosters at the Sydney Cricket Ground. In October, Asofa-Solomona was involved in an ugly brawl whilst on holiday in Bali.  The NRL later fined Asofa-Solomona $15,000 and handed him a three-match test ban for New Zealand which saw him miss both matches against Great Britain and Australia.  Asofa-Solomona says he reacted violently after it was alleged his Melbourne teammate Suliasi Vunivalu was coward-punched by an unidentified male.

2020
In the 2020 NRL Grand Final, Asofa-Solomona helped lead Melbourne to victory in their 20-26 win over the Minor Premiers Penrith. Asofa-Solomona played in 20 games in the 2020 NRL season, scoring four tries.

2021
Asofa-Solomona played a total of 17 games for Melbourne in the 2021 NRL season as the club won 19 matches in a row and claimed the Minor Premiership.  Asofa-Solomona played in two finals matches including the preliminary final where Melbourne suffered a shock 10-6 loss against eventual premiers Penrith.  He scored a try in the match but it was ruled out for obstruction.

2022 & 2023
Asofa-Solomona played 23 games for Melbourne in the 2022 NRL season as the club finished 5th on the table and were eliminated in the first week of the finals by Canberra. Following Melbourne's loss to Canterbury in round 2 of the 2023 NRL season, it was announced that Asofa-Solomona would miss six weeks with a high grade MCL injury.

Honours
Club
 2016 Minor Premiership Winners
 2017 Minor Premiership Winners
 2017 NRL Grand Final Winners
 2018 World Club Challenge Winners
 2019 Minor Premiership winners
 2020 NRL Grand Final Winners
 2021 Minor Premiership winners

Individual
 2014 Melbourne Storm Darren Bell U20s Player of The Year
 2017 New Zealand Kiwis Rookie of the Year
 2017 Spirit of ANZAC Medal 
 2018 World Club Challenge Man of the match

References

External links
Melbourne Storm profile
Storm profile
NRL profile
2017 RLWC profile

1996 births
Living people
Junior Kiwis players
Melbourne Storm players
New Zealand national rugby league team players
New Zealand people of Irish descent
New Zealand people of Tokelauan descent
New Zealand sportspeople of Samoan descent
New Zealand rugby league players
Rugby league players from Wellington City
Rugby league props
Rugby league second-rows
Sunshine Coast Falcons players
Upper Hutt Tigers players